Mosino is a rural locality (a selo) in Vladimir, Vladimir Oblast, Russia. The population was 18 as of 2010. There are 20 streets.

Geography 
Mosino is located 16 km west of Vladimir. Spasskoye is the nearest rural locality.

References 

Rural localities in Vladimir Urban Okrug